The Ma'an Dam ('Saddle Dam') is a concrete gravity barrage dam on the Dajia River in Heping District, Taichung, Taiwan. The dam is the final stage in a cascade of hydroelectric power plants along the Dajia River and is located below the Tienlun Dam.

The dam supplies water through a tunnel to a 133.47 MW power station near Xinshe with two 66.735 MW turbines, generating 410.2 million kilowatt hours per year.

See also

 List of power stations in Taiwan
 List of dams and reservoirs in Taiwan
 Electricity sector in Taiwan

References

1998 establishments in Taiwan
Dams in Taichung
Gravity dams
Hydroelectric power stations in Taiwan
Dams completed in 1998